Jennifer Pisana is a Canadian television and movie actress.

Filmography

Film

Television

References

20th-century Canadian actresses
21st-century Canadian actresses
Canadian child actresses
Canadian film actresses
Canadian television actresses
Living people
Year of birth missing (living people)